Henry López may refer to:
Henry López Báez (born 1967), Uruguayan footballer
Henry López (footballer, born 1992), Guatemalan footballer

See also
Henry Lopes (disambiguation)
Enrique López (disambiguation)